James Hamilton Calder (born 20 August 1957) is a former Scotland international rugby union player.

Rugby Union career

Amateur career

He played club rugby for Stewart's Melville.

Provincial career

He played for Edinburgh District. He was part of the side that won the 1986–87 Scottish Inter-District Championship.

He played for the Reds Trial side in their match against Blues Trial on 3 January 1987.

He played for Combined Scottish Districts on 1 March 1986 against South of Scotland.

International career

He received 2 caps for Scotland 'B' in 1979 to 1980.

His full international debut came in 1981 aged 21 against France. Scotland were on the receiving end of a 16–9 loss. He scored the winning try in Scotland's 21–12 victory over France at Murrayfield in 1984 which gave Scotland its first Grand Slam since 1925.

In 1983 he toured New Zealand with the British & Irish Lions.

Family

His twin brother, Finlay Calder, also played for Scotland and captained the 1989 British Lions tour to Australia. The brothers never played in the same Scotland side; Jim Calder won the last of his caps against  in March 1985 and Finlay made his debut against  in January 1986. Jim won a total of 27 caps, with his career record ending as: Won 12, Lost 13, Drew 2.

His two sons, Duncan and Lewis, have also represented Scotland at U21 level. Duncan, his elder son, retired from the game due to knee problems.
He also has a daughter called Hannah.

References

1957 births
Living people
British & Irish Lions rugby union players from Scotland
Edinburgh District (rugby union) players
People educated at Stewart's Melville College
Reds Trial players
Rugby union players from Haddington, East Lothian
Scotland 'B' international rugby union players
Scotland international rugby union players
Scottish rugby union players
Stewart's Melville RFC players
Scottish twins
Twin sportspeople
Scottish Districts (combined) players